The Vermilion Formation is a geologic formation in British Columbia. It preserves fossils dating back to the Cambrian period.

See also

 List of fossiliferous stratigraphic units in British Columbia

References
 

Cambrian British Columbia
Cambrian southern paleotropical deposits